FlexFlight is a Danish aircraft operator. It was founded in 2003 by Christian Honoré in Roskilde, Denmark. FlexFlight's primary business is Aircraft Management, and secondary business is air charter services around the world. Also, FlexFlight partners with airlines from around the globe to sell tickets to the Airlines' pre-existing and scheduled flights. The charter airline began back in 2003 operating twice weekly Piper Chieftain services from Roskilde and Gothenburg City, to the Danish island Laesoe. Today the fleet are ranging from Light to Heavy Jets, as well as two Turboprops - covering worldwide charter and ambulance flights

Fleet
The FlexFlight fleet consists of the following aircraft (as of March 2022).

References

Airlines of Denmark
Airlines established in 2003
2006 establishments in Denmark
Charter airlines
Companies based in Roskilde Municipality